Charenton-du-Cher is a commune  in the Cher department in the Centre-Val de Loire region of France.

Geography

Population

Sights
 The church of St. Martin, dating from the eleventh century.
 The motte of a tenth-century castle (30m diameter, 10m high).
 A fifteenth-century house on the rue Blanche.
 An old forge and its associated buildings, La "Grosse Forge"
 Remains of the convent abbey of Notre-Dame de Bellevaux, founded in 620.
 The remains of the 15th century chapel of St. Julien.
 A public washhouse.

See also
Communes of the Cher department

References

Communes of Cher (department)